The 1991 NSWRL season was the eighty-fourth season of professional rugby league football in Australia. This year the New South Wales Rugby League experimented with a draft system for the first time. Sixteen clubs competed for the J J Giltinan Shield and Winfield Cup premiership during the season, which culminated in a replay of the previous year's grand final between the Canberra Raiders and the Penrith Panthers.

Season summary 
The 1991 New South Wales Rugby League season started with controversy. For the first time a draft system which had been developed was put into operation. The draft allowed teams to recruit players on a roster system based on where the club finished the previous year. It ran in reverse order with the wooden spooners getting first choice and the premiers last. The draft lasted just the one season before being defeated in the courts by players and coaches opposed to its limitations. The controversy started after Terry Hill, who had agreed to join the Warren Ryan coached Western Suburbs, was drafted to play for Easts. Hill appealed his drafting, though his appeal was initially overturned and he eventually agreed to a three-year contract with the Roosters. However, by the end of 1991 the High Court had overturned the draft system and in 1992 Hill was given a release and he was able to move on to Wests.

In 22 rounds of regular season football which lasted from March till August, eventual premiers Penrith won 17 games, drew one and lost only four. The Panthers finished on 35 premiership points and took their first minor premiership ahead of Manly and Norths (both 29 points), Canberra on 28 with Wests sneaking in on 27 points after beating Canterbury 19–14 in a play off.

On 24 July it was revealed that the Canberra Raiders had substantially breached their $1.5 million salary cap for 1991.

The record for attendance at a match at Campbelltown Stadium was set this season with a crowd figure of 21,527 for a game between Western Suburbs and St. George. Also this season the NSWRL took a match between St. George and Balmain to the Adelaide Oval and it was met with success as 28,884 spectators (the highest non-finals attendance of the season) turned out for the game on a cold and wet Friday night in June. The game was taken to Adelaide not only for the NSWRL to expand into traditional Australian Rules Football strongholds, but also as the Dragons long time major sponsor Penfolds is an Adelaide-based company.

The 1991 season's Rothmans Medal was awarded to Canterbury-Bankstown's Ewan McGrady, who was also named as Rugby League Week's player of the year. The Dally M Award was won by St. George's Michael Potter, the first  to do so.

Teams

The number of teams competing remained unchanged for the third consecutive year, with sixteen clubs contesting the premiership, including five inner Sydney-based foundation teams, another six from greater Sydney, two from greater New South Wales, two from Queensland, and one from the Australian Capital Territory.

Advertising
1991 again saw the NSWRL use Tina Turner's 1989 version of "The Best" in their advertising. The league's ad agency Hertz Walpole had sufficient extra footage from her 1990 visit to Sydney to add fresh images of Tina to other recent shots of the 1990 finals series and 1991 pre-season training images.

The finished 1991 ad in its full length version shows Tina performing the song in the glamorous surroundings of Boomerang, a palatial harbour-side Sydney mansion. She climbs the Sydney Harbour Bridge and a spectacular final helicopter pull-back shot shows her belting out the anthem from the apex of the bridge. In those days before public access via the commercial BridgeClimb operation this image was as fantastic notionally as it was visually.

Regular season

Bold – Home game
X – Bye
Opponent for round listed above margin

Ladder

Ladder progression

Numbers highlighted in green indicate that the team finished the round inside the top 5.
Numbers highlighted in blue indicates the team finished first on the ladder in that round.
Numbers highlighted in red indicates the team finished last place on the ladder in that round.

Finals

Chart

Grand final
On the sunny afternoon of Sunday, 22 September the Sydney Football Stadium was packed to capacity with a crowd of 41,815 for the rematch of the previous season's grand final, and Canberra's third in a row. The day also featured a tribute to the original 'Gladiators', Norm Provan and Arthur Summons on the Winfield Cup trophy's 10th anniversary (in the 50th grand final played) as well as a rendition of the national anthem by Anthony Warlow. The game was broadcast live on television throughout Australia by Channel Ten with match commentary by Graeme Hughes, Bill Anderson and Wayne Pearce.

1st half

Referee Bill Harrigan blew time on and the Penrith side kicked off. Around seven minutes later when Penrith had made their way into good field position, their hooker Royce Simmons received the ball about ten metres from the try-line and ran it, stepping and spinning his way past several defenders to score a great individual try, his first of the season. Penrith captain Greg Alexander kicked the conversion for his side to lead 6–0. Shortly after that Canberra's half-back Ricky Stuart got the ball a few metres into Penrith's half and kicked over to the open left corner of the field where his winger, Matthew Wood was racing through to grab the bouncing ball and dive over in the corner to score. Meninga's conversion attempt missed so the Penrith side held their lead at 6–4. The scores were levelled a few minutes later though when Alexander appeared to be trying to put his knees into Meninga as he tackled him, drawing a penalty, which Canberra captain successfully kicked to make it 6-6. Meninga later opted to take the kick when awarded another penalty inside Penrith's half, but missed. Soon after that Canberra had the ball on the right wing around half way and swung it through the hands out to the left where their lock forward Bradley Clyde made a break and passed it on to Wood to again cross in the corner for his second try. Meninga's kick was wide again so the Raiders were leading 6-10.

The contest continued to be played from end to end of the field. In the final minutes of the first half, during one of Canberra's attacking raids they got another penalty and Matthew Wood took the kick, getting another two points for his side to lead 6-12 going into the break. The Raiders lead could have easily been 18-6 had Penrith winger Graham Mackay not pulled off a great try-saving tackle only metres from the line on his opposite number Paul Martin close to half-time. The half-time score replicated the position of the two teams at the same point in the previous year's decider.

2nd half

Early in the second half Canberra were penalised for stripping in their own half of the field and Alexander took the kick at goal but missed. Then as the Canberra side were trying to work the ball away from their goal-line, they knocked on, with Penrith winger Paul Smith getting the ball and diving over in the corner. However referee Bill Harrigan called the play back after touch judge Martin Weekes reported that Canberra's Mark Bell had been taken out with a swinging arm. Penrith forward Mark Geyer's reaction to the ruling prompted Harrigan to send him to the sin bin for ten minutes. Later the Penrith club appeared certain to score from close range through Brad Izzard but Canberra's lone defender Laurie Daley stripped the ball in a one-on-one tackle.

Penrith's unsuccessful scoring opportunities continued until finally, after working the ball up to the opposition's half, they kept it alive on the third tackle till Brad Izzard broke free from over twenty metres out and ran to the try-line to touch down behind the uprights. The scores were brought level at 12 all when Alexander kicked the extra two points. With just under seven minutes of the match remaining, and again having worked the ball into Canberra's half of the field, Penrith on the fifth tackle passed it to Greg Alexander just past the forty-metre line to kick a field goal, getting his side a one-point lead at 13–12. Penrith continued to enjoy the majority of possession and field position, and when the Raiders attempted a short line drop-out Geyer got the bouncing ball in open space, passing it to 33-year-old Royce Simmons who scored in the corner, getting Penrith their first premiership in the last match of his career. Alexander kicked the conversion from the sideline so the final score was 19–12.

Penrith Panthers 19Tries: Simmons 2, IzzardGoals: Alexander 3/3Field Goal: Alexander

Canberra Raiders 12Tries: Wood 2Goals: Meninga 1/2, Wood 1/1

Clive Churchill Medal winner: Bradley Clyde (Canberra)

Post match

Although MMI's unofficial man-of-the-match award went to Royce Simmons, the Governor of New South Wales Peter Sinclair awarded the Clive Churchill Medal to the losing side's Bradley Clyde, the second time that he won the prestigious award, having previously won the Clive Churchill medal in 1989. The Australian Prime Minister Bob Hawke then presented Penrith captain Greg Alexander with the Winfield Cup trophy as well as the J. J. Giltinan Shield. It was the Penrith Panthers' first premiership and their young coach, Phil Gould has rated his team's second half in this game as an example of a perfect half of football. After failing to follow their first half game plan and squandering an early lead, in the second half the Panthers played to a formula of taking the ball up for full sets of six tackles, with Alexander then expertly kicking for the corners and the whole side pinning Canberra down at their own end with committed defence.

World Club Challenge

Having won the premiership, the Panthers travelled to England to face the British Champions, Wigan in the 1991 World Club Challenge on 9 October at Anfield, Liverpool. Penrith were defeated 4 to 21 in front of 20,152 spectators.

Player statistics
The following statistics are as of the conclusion of Round 22.

Top 5 point scorers

Top 5 try scorers

Top 5 goal scorers

Attendances
The regular season attendances for the 1991 season aggregated to a total of 2,413,218 at an average of 13,188 per game.

The highest ten regular season match attendances:

References

External links
Chesterton, Ray (1996) Good as Gould  Ironbark Press, Sydney
Rugby League Tables - Season 1991 The World of Rugby League
1991 J J Giltinan Shield and Winfield Cup at rleague.com
NSWRL season 1991 at rugbyleagueproject.com
Results: 1991-2000 at rabbitohs.com.au

New South Wales Rugby League premiership
NSWRL season